Mandali Sport Club, is an Iraqi football team based in Mandali, Diyala, that plays in Iraq Division Three.

History

Re-establish
After it was canceled forty years ago, Mandali Sport club was re-established in November 2020 by the Ministry of Youth and Sports.

Managerial history
 Adnan Ali Khamis

See also 
 2021–22 Iraq FA Cup

References

External links
 Mandali SC on Goalzz.com
 Iraq Clubs- Foundation Dates

2020 establishments in Iraq
Association football clubs established in 2020
Football clubs in Diyala